Petronella Johanna Nelly de Rooij (30 July 1883 – 10 June 1964) was a Dutch zoologist and herpetologist.

Biography
De Rooij was born in Weesp, and she studied Medicine in Amsterdam until discrimination against her gender in Dutch law obliged her to continue her studies in Zurich. She studied the cardiovascular system of salamanders of the genus Andrias, and she was awarded her Doctor of Philosophy by the University of Zurich in 1907. With her qualification she was able to return to Amsterdam where she became a curator at the museum of zoology within the University of Amsterdam.

In 1922 she was obliged to leave due to administrative reforms, but in this short academic career she was able to publish The Reptiles of the Indo-Australian Archipelago. The book was based on reptile specimens that were sent to the museum from the Dutch East Indies.

De Rooij died in Arnhem in 1964.

Legacy
De Rooij had two reptile species named after her: Petronella's kukri snake (Oligodon petronellae) by Jean Roux in 1917 and De Rooij's skink (Sphenomorphus derooyae), originally named Lygosoma derooyae by Jan Komelis de Jong in 1927.

Taxa described by de Rooij
Calamaria ceramensis, 1913
Calamaria lautensis, 1917
Cyrtodactylus malayanus, 1915
Cyrtodactylus sermowaiensis, 1915
Draco taeniopterus, 1915 
Eugongylus unilineatus, 1915
Sphenomorphus longicaudatus, 1915
Sphenomorphus nigriventris, 1915
Stegonotus florensis, 1917
Tribolonotus gracilis, 1909

References

1883 births
1964 deaths
People from Weesp
Dutch herpetologists
University of Amsterdam alumni
Women herpetologists
20th-century Dutch zoologists
20th-century Dutch women scientists
Dutch women curators